Jonna Ann-Charlotte Andersson (born 2 January 1993) is a Swedish professional footballer who plays as a defender for Swedish club Hammarby IF and the Sweden women's national football team.

Club career
Andersson signed for Linköpings FC in 2009 and made two league appearances in her first season as the club won the Damallsvenskan title. After three seasons where she was mainly a substitute, she became an important starting player of the team in the 2013 season.

In December 2017, Andersson joined the FA WSL side Chelsea. In 2019, she renewed her contract until 2022. With Chelsea, Andersson won three consecutive Women's Super League titles, in 2019–20, 2020–21 and 2021–22. The 2020 WSL title was given to Chelsea on a points-per-game basis after the league was stopped due to the COVID-19 pandemic.

On 5 April 2022, Andersson confirmed she would return to Damallsvenskan, signing a two-and-a-half year contract with Hammarby IF. The transfer came to effect in August when the Swedish transfer window opened.

International career
As a Sweden under-19 international, Andersson featured at the 2012 UEFA Women's Under-19 Championship in Turkey. Sweden won the tournament by beating Spain 1–0 in the final after extra time.

Senior team coach Pia Sundhage called up Andersson for the first time in January 2016 for a friendly against Scotland, as a replacement for Amanda Ilestedt who had a back injury. She played at left-back as the Scots were defeated 6–0 at Prioritet Serneke Arena. Andersson retained her place in the squad for the 2016 UEFA Women's Olympic Qualifying Tournament.

Career statistics

International 
Scores and results list Sweden's goal tally first, score column indicates score after each Andersson goal.

Honours

Club
Linköpings FC
 Damallsvenskan: 2009, 2016, 2017
 Svenska Cupen: 2013–14, 2014–15

Chelsea
 FA WSL: 2017–18, 2019–20, 2020–21, 2021–22
 Women's FA Cup: 2017–18, 2020–21, 2021–22
 FA Women's League Cup: 2019–20, 2020–21
 Women's FA Community Shield: 2020

International
Sweden
 Summer Olympic Games: Silver Medal, 2016

References

External links

 
 
 

1993 births
Living people
People from Mjölby Municipality
Footballers from Östergötland County
Swedish women's footballers
Sweden women's youth international footballers
Sweden women's international footballers
Swedish expatriate women's footballers
Women's association football defenders
Olympic footballers of Sweden
Linköpings FC players
Chelsea F.C. Women players
Hammarby Fotboll (women) players
Damallsvenskan players
Women's Super League players
Expatriate women's footballers in England
Swedish expatriate sportspeople in England
Footballers at the 2016 Summer Olympics
Medalists at the 2016 Summer Olympics
Olympic silver medalists for Sweden
Olympic medalists in football
UEFA Women's Euro 2017 players
2019 FIFA Women's World Cup players
Footballers at the 2020 Summer Olympics
Medalists at the 2020 Summer Olympics
UEFA Women's Euro 2022 players